Pierre-Hugues Herbert and Nicolas Mahut won the men's doubles tennis title at the 2018 French Open, defeating Oliver Marach and Mate Pavić in the final, 6–2, 7–6(7–4). Herbert and Mahut were the third all-French team to reach the French Open men's doubles final in six years.

Ryan Harrison and Michael Venus were the defending champions, but they chose not to compete together this year. Harrison played alongside Vasek Pospisil, but lost in the first round to Federico Delbonis and Benoît Paire. Venus teamed up with Raven Klaasen, but lost in the third round to Nikola Mektić and Alexander Peya.

Pavić retained the ATP no. 1 doubles ranking when fellow contenders John Peers, Łukasz Kubot and Mike Bryan all lost before the semifinals.

Bob Bryan withdrew from the tournament with a right hip injury, ending a streak of 76 consecutive Grand Slam events played alongside his brother Mike as a team. Current US Open title holder, Horia Tecău, missed his first Grand Slam in 10 years with injury.

Seeds

Draw

Finals

Top half

Section 1

Section 2

Bottom half

Section 3

Section 4

References

External links
2018 French Open – Men's draws and results at the International Tennis Federation

Men's Doubles
French Open by year – Men's doubles
French Open - Men's Doubles